Tristian Gary Crawford (born 22 July 1982) is an Australian pitcher for the Brisbane Bandits.

Career
He was signed to the Minnesota Twins organisation in 2000 and played AA and AAA until 2008.

Crawford used to play for the Runcorn Indians and the Redlands Rays but now resides with the Windsor Royals. He also has represented the Australian team at the 2006 World Baseball Classic and the Queensland Rams in the Claxton Shield. He debuted for the Cavalry in 2011 against his home team, the Brisbane Bandits, throwing 5 innings for 1 earned run.

References

External links

Australian Baseball Federation Profile

1982 births
Living people
Australian baseball players
Baseball pitchers
Baseball players from Alaska
Brisbane Bandits players
Canberra Cavalry players
Clearwater Threshers players
Fort Myers Miracle players
Grand Prairie AirHogs players
Gulf Coast Twins players
Harrisburg Senators players
Laredo Broncos players
New Britain Rock Cats players
Quad Cities River Bandits players
Reading Phillies players
Rochester Red Wings players
Sportspeople from Anchorage, Alaska
2006 World Baseball Classic players
2009 World Baseball Classic players